Barbar Qaleh may refer to:
 Barbar Qaleh, Golestan
 Barbar Qaleh, North Khorasan